The Emeralda Marsh Conservation Area (EMCA) is a  U.S. conservation area administered by the St. Johns River Water Management District in Florida. It is to the east of the Lake Griffin State Park, and covers parts of Lake and Marion counties. In December 1974, it was designated a National Natural Landmark.

It is one of the sites along the Great Florida Birding Trail.

References

Protected areas of Lake County, Florida
Protected areas of Marion County, Florida
National Natural Landmarks in Florida
St. Johns River Water Management District reserves
Marshes of Florida
Landforms of Lake County, Florida
Landforms of Marion County, Florida
1974 establishments in Florida
Protected areas established in 1974